Birkerød is a town in Rudersdal Municipality in the northern outskirts of Copenhagen, Denmark. It is surrounded by several lakes and small woodlands. Birkerød station is located on the Hillerød radial of the S-train suburban network.

History
The parish of Birkerød contained the villages Birkerød, Kajerød, Bistrup, Ravnsnæs, Isterød, Høsterkøb, Sandbjerg and Ubberød.

Birkerød became a railway town in 1868, when the Nordbanen railway opened a station here between Lyngby and Helsingør. This led to new growth and several brickyards opened in the area in the second half of the 19th century. The rail line between Copenhagen and Hillerød was later converted to an S-train suburban line and construction of new residential neighbourhoods accelerated in the 1940s which, in time, made Birkerød merge with Bistrup to the south, Kajerød to the west and Ravnsnæs to the east.

Geography
 
Birkerød is bordered by 941-hectare Lake Furesø to the south and Lake Sjælsø to the north. The smaller Birkerød Lake is located just south of the railway station in the town centre. The approximately 86 hectares wetland Vaserne (in Danish) along the northeastern shores of Lake Furesø and the western part of Frederikslund Forest separate Birkerød (Bistrup) from Holte to the southeast. Bistrup Hegn is situated between Bistrup to the south and Birkerød to the north. Rude Forest is located to the east of Birkerød. Eskemose Forest at Lake Sjælsø, north of Kajerød, is the site of several natural springs.

Townscape 
 
Birkerød consists mainly of single family detached homes.

Tegnestuen Vandkunsten has designed a number of housing estates. Trudeslund (1980-81) is a co-housing community. The concept was later developed further with Jystrup Savværk in Jystrup. The Langkjærgård development is from 1985 and Blikfanget was built in 1988-1989. Søhuse (1995), a development of terraced housing, is located on a gently sloping site on the banks of Birkerød Lake.

Culture and sports
Mantziusgården, the former state school, is now used as a local cultural centre. Activities include art exhibitions, concerts, theatre and stand-up comedy. The premises also comprise four open workshops with facilities for making graphic art, glass art, ceramics and weaving. Other cultural Institutions includes Birkerød Library and the Local Historic Archives.

Birkerød Sports and Leisure Centre was built in 2007 and is located next to the indoor swimming hall and football pitches, both of which was renovated simultaneously. The new centre was designed by Schmidt hammer lassen and is used for a wide variety of activities, including team handball fitness and yoga as well as concerts and other cultural events. 

The local football club of IF Skjold Birkerød was founded in 1917, and currently plays the Danish 2nd Division East. Furesø Golf Club is based at Hestkøbgård in the western part of Birkerød. The club was established in 1974.

Education
Birkerød Gymnasium was founded as a private boys' school in 1868. In 2007 it changed name to Birkerød Gymnasium, HF, IB og Kostskole (Birkerød Gymnasium, HF, IB & Boarding School). The name change is due to the additional education types added since the foundation of the school. The school has over 1000 students, 300 of those being International Baccalaureate (IB) candidates. It is currently the biggest public IB school in Denmark. There is also a boarding school with about 70 students living on campus. Most of these students have been expats earlier in their life and might still have family members living as expats around the world.

Since 2011, a Model UN at has been taking place annually at Birkerød Gymnasium. At BIGMUN 2019, approximately 370 students from 33 different schools around the world participated. These countries include: United States, Israel, Germany, Spain and more.

Buildings of worship

Birkerød Church is a traditional Danish parish church whose oldest parts date from the late 12th and early 13th century. The tower was built in the late 15th century, the current chancel in about 1500 and the porch in 1525. The Parish of Bistrup was disjoined from that of Birkerød in 1963 and its church was inaugurated in 1967.

The property Nordvanggård  housed a congregation of Sisters of the Precious Blood from the late 1950s until 2015. The Sisters belong to the German Province, the provincial house is in Neuenbeken near Paderborn. They also have a convent in Rønne on the island of Bornholm. The building is now owned by Rudersdal Municipality and is temporarily used to house refugees.

Transport

Rail
Birkerød station is located on the Hillerød radial of the S-train network. The station is served by the A trains during the day time (weekdays only) and E trains in the evening.

Road
Lyngby Kongevej bisects Birkerød on its way from Copenhagen to Hillerød. The Hillerød Motorway passed Birkerød to the west and the Helsingør Motorway passes Birkerød to the east.

Bus
From Birkerød station:
 196: to Kajerød (Birkerød north)
 197: to Holte Station
 198: to Bistrup
 199: to Birkerød west/industrial zone
 500S: Ørestad station - Ballerup station - Birkerød station - Kokkedal station

From Bistrup:
 334: Stenløse station - Farum station - Bistrup - Holte station

Notable people

Businesspeople
 Povl Badstuber (1685 – 1762 in Birkerød), coppersmith and manufacturer

Culture
 Aage Bertelsen (1873 – 1945 in Birkerød), landscape painter], lived in Birkerød
 Axel Borup-Jørgensen (1924 – 2012 in Birkerød), composer
 Birgitte Hjort Sørensen (born 1982), actress, was. raised in Birkerød 
 Hella Joof (born 1962 in Birkerød), actress and director, was born in Birkerød 
 Tina Kiberg (born 1958), operatic soprano, grew up  in Birkerød
 Rasmus Kofoed (born 1974 in Birkerød), chef and restaurateur, was born in Birkerød
 Carl Edvard Sonne (17941878), printmaker, was born in Birkerød
 Jørgen Sonne (1801 in Birkerød – 1890), born and raised in Birkerød

Politics

 Thorkil Kristensen (1899 – 1989 in Birkerød), politician
 Flemming Kofod-Svendsen (born 1944)., politician, lives in Birkerød
 Erling Brøndum (1930–2017 in Birkerød), politician, lived in Birkerød
 Sophie Løhde (born 1983) a Danish politician and Govt. Minister

Sport 

 Kai Jensen (1897 – 1997 in Birkerød) an athlete who competed at the 1924 Summer Olympics
 Bjarne Sørensen (born 1954 in Birkerød) a Danish former cyclist, competed at the 1976 and 1980 Summer Olympics
 Ditte Jensen (born 1980 in Birkerød) swimmer, competed in the 1996 Summer Olympics
 Mathias Tauber (born 1984 in Birkerød) a retired Danish footballer with 325 club caps
 Julie Hjorth-Hansen (born 1984 in Birkerød) swimmer, competed in 2008 Summer Olympics
 Martin Toft Madsen (born 1985 in Birkerød) a Danish cyclist
 Patrick Russell (born 1993 in Birkerød) a Danish professional ice hockey forward
 Anton Ipsen (born 1994) a Danish swimmer, participated in 2016 Summer Olympics
 Mathias Kvistgaarden (born 2002) a Danish footballer, who plays for Brøndby IF

Other
 Martin Ågerup (1966 in Birkerød) an economist, president of think tank CEPOS

Twinnings

References

Sources 
 Municipal statistics: NetBorger Kommunefakta, delivered from KMD aka Kommunedata (Municipal Data)
 Municipal mergers and neighbors: Eniro new municipalities map
 Bus data: Køreplaner bus

External links

Municipality's official website
Birkerød Gymnasium website
Birkerød Gymnasium Model UN website
Satellite map from Google Maps

 
Former municipalities of Denmark
Cities and towns in the Capital Region of Denmark
Copenhagen metropolitan area
Rudersdal Municipality